Hyperdata are data objects linked to other data objects in other places, as hypertext indicates text linked to other text in other places. Hyperdata enables formation of a web of data, evolving from the "data on the Web" that is not inter-related (or at least, not linked).

In the same way that hypertext usually refers to the World Wide Web but is a broader term, hyperdata usually refers to the Semantic Web, but may also be applied more broadly to other data-linking technologies such as microformats – including XHTML Friends Network.

A hypertext link indicates that a link exists between two documents or "information resources". Hyperdata links go beyond simply such a connection, and express semantics about the kind of connection being made. For instance, in a document about Hillary Clinton, a hypertext link might be made from the word senator to a document about the United States Senate. In contrast, a hyperdata link from the same word to the same document might also state that senator was one of Hillary Clinton's roles, titles, or positions (depending on the ontology being used to define this link).

Semantic Web 
The Semantic Web introduces the controversial concept of links to non-data resources. In the Semantic Web, links are not limited to "information resources" or documents, such as the typical Web page. Hyperdata links may refer to a physical structure (e.g., "the Eiffel Tower"), a place ("Champ de Mars" where the Eiffel Tower stands), a person (Gustave Eiffel, the man responsible for the tower's construction), or other "non-information resources".  It is worth noting that the links in this article are hypertext, not hyperdata, and they all lead to documents which describe the entities named.

A hyperdata browser (also called a Semantic Web browser), is a browser used to navigate the Semantic Web. Semantic Web architecture does not necessarily involve the HTML document format, which typical HTML Web browsers rely upon. A hyperdata browser specifically requests RDF data from Web servers, often through content negotiation or conneg, starting from the same URL as the traditional Web browser; the Web server may immediately return the requested RDF, or it may deliver a redirection to a new URI where the RDF may actually be found, or the RDF may be embedded in the same HTML document which would be returned to a Web browser which did not request RDF. The RDF data will generally describe the resource represented by the originally requested URI. The hyperdata browser then renders the information received as an HTML page that contains hyperlinks for users to navigate to indicated resources.

See also 
 Data Web
 Linked data
 Web resource
 Web service

References

Hypertext
Hypermedia
Electronic literature